Borduria is a village near Khonsa in Tirap district of Arunachal Pradesh, India.
Its chief tribe is the Lowangs. The current head is Wanglin Lowangdong . The people of the region are known for their self-dependence and most activities are overseen by the members of the ruling tribe.

References

Villages in Tirap district